The historic 21-story Rhodes–Haverty Building was, at the time of its construction in 1929, the tallest building in Atlanta, Georgia. Designed by Atlanta architects Pringle and Smith, the building was built by furniture magnates A. G. Rhodes of Rhodes Furniture and J. J. Haverty of Havertys.  It remained the tallest building in Atlanta until 1954.

The building was converted from office use in 1995-1996 to become a Marriott Residence Inn, the Residence Inn Atlanta Downtown.

The building and the district are listed on the National Register of Historic Places.

Origin of name
The building was constructed for the Rhodes Haverty Investment Company, a partnership of furniture magnates Amos G. Rhodes of Rhodes Furniture and J. J. Haverty of Haverty's. It was not named for the Rhodes–Haverty Furniture Company (1889-1908), which had already been dissolved.

Immediately across Peachtree Street is the English-American Building, commonly referred to as the Flatiron Building.

See also
Rhodes Memorial Hall
National Register of Historic Places listings in Fulton County, Georgia
Hotels in Atlanta

References

External links

 "Rhodes–Haverty Building", City of Atlanta Online
 Residence Inn Atlanta Downtown official website

Buildings and structures completed in 1929
Hotels in Atlanta
Marriott International
Hotel buildings on the National Register of Historic Places in Georgia (U.S. state)
Pringle and Smith buildings
National Register of Historic Places in Atlanta
1929 establishments in Georgia (U.S. state)